Erik Lindh (born 24 May 1964, in Kungälv) is a former international Swedish table tennis player who competed in the 1988 Summer Olympics and in the 1992 Summer Olympics.

In the 1988 Summer Olympics in Seoul he finished in third place and won the bronze medal.

He was a member of the winning Swedish teams in the 1989, 1991 and 1993 World Table Tennis Team Championships.

He also won an English Open title.

Lindh was a pioneer of the style of looping the ball very early - often straight after the bounce.

See also
 List of table tennis players
 List of World Table Tennis Championships medalists

References

External links
  "Erik Lindh vs. Mattew Syed - Sear's International Challenge - Video"
 picture
 
 
 
 

1964 births
Living people
Swedish male table tennis players
Olympic table tennis players of Sweden
Table tennis players at the 1988 Summer Olympics
Table tennis players at the 1992 Summer Olympics
Olympic bronze medalists for Sweden
Olympic medalists in table tennis
Medalists at the 1988 Summer Olympics
People from Kungälv Municipality
Sportspeople from Västra Götaland County